The Suffolk Cooperative Library System (SCLS) is a public library system, providing services to public libraries in Suffolk County, New York, United States. The system is governed by a nine-member board elected by trustees of member libraries.

Mission
According to the mission statement, SCLS aims to provide "traditional and innovative public library service to all the people of Suffolk County." In 2010, SCLS introduced the Live-brary service, a "digital branch" with databases, historical newspapers, downloadable audio and ebooks, and other research tools available for patrons of member libraries.

History
SCLS was established in 1961 and for the first 10 years of its existence operated out of the basement of the Patchogue-Medford Library.

References

Education in Suffolk County, New York
Public libraries in New York (state)
1961 establishments in New York (state)